Kobda is an aul and the administrative center of  Kobda district of Aktobe Region in Kazakhstan.
Kobda is on the Kobda River.

References

Populated places in Aktobe Region